Active Training and Education (a.k.a. ATE Superweeks) is a not-for-profit, educational charity which provides residential holidays to children of a school age within the United Kingdom. These holidays are called Superweeks.

ATE seeks to contribute to British children's education by providing opportunities to learn about themselves, other people ,and to discover new things about the world around them. Through Superweeks, ATE provides children a safe, supportive environment away from the pressure of ‘real life’. Superweeks cultivates child-focused holidays where days are play-packed and leave a child with memories that ATE believes are essential to a happy childhood. They achieve this by having a deep rooted, traceable history in education, and running unique intensive residential training courses for the volunteers who care for the children.

Holidays

ATE's core activity is providing residential experience for children of a school age within the United Kingdom. Superweeks are residential holidays (at New Year, Easter and Summer) that take place in country houses and mansions at various locations around the United Kingdom. The holidays are designed for children aged 8 to 16 years.

ATE believes in a world where all children can feel safe, loved and supported and a world where all children have the opportunity to have real adventures. A safe place from which they can launch themselves into the unknown, whilst all the time discovering and learning ever more new things about themselves. ATE wants a world where life is not a series of things that have to be done, but of possibilities to savour, to have fun with and to remember forever. Children need to be exposed to situations from which they can go away with increased confidence and personal aspirations and, above all, where they can feel, and be, themselves.

More children need to play; play outside and with other people. There is an often heard complaint within our society that children are growing up too fast, so formal education needs to be complemented with imaginative, active interaction. Children need an environment in which they can explore their imaginations, the unrealistic and the still-fictional; a carefree environment with limitless possibilities that encourages them to reach for the stars.

More children need happier childhood experiences and memories created with other children and other adults. ATE wants Britain's children to have increased, real experiences of positive social interaction with varied personalities. This will lead to better socially-educated young people, and an increased tolerance of others and a positive perspective of the world.

The children
Children come on Superweeks from all over the UK and some from beyond. They come from a wide range of socio-economic backgrounds, and although most are paid for in total by their family, a significant minority (about 15%) are sponsored either by ATE's own sponsorship fund or by other bodies such as the Social Services. They come to Superweeks to learn about the value of play and how to make new friends with children from a very wide range of backgrounds and with adults who are neither parents nor teachers.

Superweeks are designed to be accessible and enjoyable to children from all walks of life, regardless of their personal tastes. They do not focus excessively on physical or outdoor pursuits, but instead use a wide range of activities including games, singing, drama and handicraft as the framework for a happy and constructive experience of community living. The organisation makes every effort to be inclusive and will accept children with special needs or behavioural difficulties whenever it seems reasonably clear that their attendance will be successful.

Key people
ATE was founded by Chris Green, who was awarded the MBE in the New Year Honours List 2011 for services to education through ATE and summer camps. He had previously been involved in establishing and managing Colony Holidays (est. 1963), a provider of summer camps in the United Kingdom from the 1960s to 1980s. Green still campaigns for summer camps in the UK.

Governance
ATE is a non-denominational body whose only aim or allegiance is educational, and as such it has strong links with the educational establishment. Most of the main educational bodies are represented on its Governing Body, and many of the senior staff on Superweeks are experienced and highly committed school teachers.

All of the activities of ATE are overseen by a Governing Body which includes representatives from most of the major educational bodies in the UK, and meets on three occasions each year.

History

The Council for Colony Holidays for Schoolchildren (CCHS)
The Council for Colony Holidays for Schoolchildren was set up as an educational Trust in 1963, following initiatives by a number of young British people who had worked in the French national system of “colonies de vacances” (which catered for 5 million children a year) and who thought a similar system would have much to offer to children and young people in the UK. It was started with a launching grant from the then Ministry of Education, with a distinguished governing Council chaired by Sir John Wolfenden, and with Sir William Alexander as Secretary. In 1965 Chris Green and a colleague left teaching to work full-time for CCHS.

By the early seventies over 5000 children per annum were enjoying colony holidays during school vacations and half-terms.

Key figures 
Sir John Wolfenden was succeeded as Chairman by Lord Hill of Luton, then by Lord Vaizey of Greenwich. Sir William Alexander was succeeded as Secretary by John Brooke, Director of Education for Worcestershire (when full-time operations started CCHS established a Headquarters in Malvern).

Activity
Between 1965 and 1985 around 80,000 children experienced a colony holiday, and around 12,000 17- to 25-year-olds were recruited and trained to look after them.

CCHS worked with local authorities and others to enable poorer children to take part. It collaborated with organisations such as the Puffin Club, the National Trust, the WRVS, Manchester University Settlement and Birmingham Settlement, to run special colony holidays for them. It helped set up Discovery Holidays in Northern Ireland which ran holidays for 1,000 or more children from all backgrounds in the province each year. It worked with the Union Française des Centres de Vacances to run Anglo-French holidays. It published some books of children's games, songs, and holiday activities.

Longevity
Residential training courses were developed for Monitors, and later for the more experienced Monitors to become Assistant Directors then Directors. These courses were cited as “good practice” by D.E.S. Inspectors.

Colony Holidays developed expertise, as well as a large and well-tested repertoire, in various children's leisure activities (drama, singing and music, dance and movement, handicrafts, children's literature, environmental activities, and games of all kinds).  Colony Holidays attracted and kept the commitment and enthusiasm of many outstanding young educators, who believed deeply in what the organisation did and stood for. Many of these people have gone on to be successful Headteachers or to other positions of responsibility; they regularly attest how large a part their early training and experience of responsibility in the happy and relaxed context of a colony holiday has played in their development of management and personal skills.

Ethos

Colony Holidays, like ATE its successor body, believed that a short period spent in a residential holiday, away from TV and computers, making friends with others from all backgrounds and many different schools, taking part in a varied programme of fun activities, and by the end feeling part of a happy family-like community, can offer to children the opportunity to gain in confidence and independence, to increase social skills, to discover new interests and talents, to make new friends, and above all to live some real childhood running about and playing in green fields and woods away from all the commercial aspects and pressures of their life back home.

Many people who attended Colony Holidays as children and / or as Monitors have said what a powerful influence the experience had on them. One woman, now a hospital nurse, who came to Colony Holidays regularly over seven or eight years, wrote recently to say “thank you for the best 118 days of my childhood.”

Colony Holidays was supported and admired by a large number of leading educationists, by many schools who invited CCHS to recruit children, and by many hundreds of parents who saw how much their children were gaining both in happiness and in personal growth. A parent wrote once to say “When children come back from a colony they have a kind of glow about them.”

Legacy
Those who had set up and run Colony Holidays for 18 years handed over to a younger leadership team in the early eighties. The organisation then ran into financial difficulties and closed in 1986. The Active Training and Education Trust was established in 1996, to revive the work and the expertise of Colony Holidays.

Training courses
The young people, mostly university students, who join the organisation to work directly with small groups of children on Superweeks, are known as ‘Monitors’, and in order to act in this role they must first attend an intensive seven-day residential training course. Monitors are given feedback and targets for improvement at the end of each Superweek, and when they have performed well on at least three Superweeks and have reached the age of at least 21, they can be invited to train as  Assistant Directors. This involves a further five-day residential training course and when an individual has successfully acted in this role on at least three occasions, they can be invited to train as a Director, another five-day residential course. The Director is responsible for all aspects of running a Superweek with up to 60 children and 25 staff. Most (but not all) ATE Directors are school teachers. ATE staff, like the children, come from all over the UK and some from other countries too.

The work of Monitors and Assistant Directors on Superweeks is voluntary; they only receive expenses and bed and board for the work they do. This is a deliberate and very important part of the ATE ethos, meaning that the staff who work most directly with the children are there because they want to be there, not because they need to earn money.

ATE provides ‘in service’ training and support to its volunteer staff by providing feedback and goals for improvement at the end of each Superweek, by distributing a free magazine to staff three times each year, and by offering two residential staff weekends each year. This training and support programme is overseen by a Training Group chaired by the Director of Training and comprising senior ATE staff, including a Governor, and two head teachers.

Press Coverage

Featured as one of "The Best Holidays for Kids Only" in The Times in 2012
"No quad bikes, climbing walls or banana boats here — just enough 1950s-style fun to fill an Enid Blyton adventure. Run by the Active Training and Education Trust (0845 456 1205, ate.org.uk), the four camps, in Shropshire, Herefordshire and Worcestershire, are big on outdoor games and personal development, with trips to museums, castles and safari parks. There are also learning-focused themed weeks, including Young Inventors camp. All-inclusive seven-night Superweeks for children aged 8-16 start at £379pp, themed weeks at £399pp."
Featured as one of 'Britain's 10 Best Kids' Adventure Holidays' by The Times in 2009
"The emphasis is on the imagination: that means less of the muddy stuff and more games, crafts, day trips, surprises and parties. What's on offer? Lots of themed camps - most intriguing is the young-inventors' week, when each child will get to make their own programmable robot. Others include dance and drama, arts and crafts, and a spy week presided over by the mysterious Director General SP O'Narge, complete with a lesson in blood-spatter-analysis techniques. You may shudder, but the kids will love it."
Featured in a double-page spread in The Daily Telegraph in the article "ATE Superweeks: children's summer camps" in 2009
The article is written by a mother whose child went on a Superweek. She applauds the organisation, especially as a Not for Profit:
"Because ATE is not a commercial organisation it doesn't have to seek to attract business by offering a competitive whirlwind of glossy taster activities for children. ATE is free to concentrate on the simple joys of friendship and real childhood moments – there is plenty of time for exploring the beautiful grounds of a country house or castle, building dens, having hot chocolate around a fire, making things and generally enjoying lots of structured, often hilarious and exciting indoor and outdoor games. All the people running an ATE Superweek do it for the love of children and real childhoods."

References

External links
 
 Sing for Pleasure
 Campaign for Summer Camps
 Super Weeks Summer Camps

Summer camps in the United Kingdom
Charities based in Gloucestershire
Organizations established in 1996
Children's charities based in England